Minnesota's 5th congressional district is a geographically small urban and suburban congressional district in Minnesota. It covers eastern Hennepin County, including the entire city of Minneapolis, along with parts of Anoka and Ramsey counties. Besides Minneapolis, major cities in the district include St. Louis Park, Richfield, Crystal, Robbinsdale, Golden Valley, New Hope, Fridley, and a small portion of Edina.

It was created in 1883, and was nicknamed the "Bloody Fifth" on account of its first election.  The contest between Knute Nelson and Charles F. Kindred involved graft, intimidation, and election fraud at every turn. The Republican convention on July 12 in Detroit Lakes was compared to the historic Battle of the Boyne in Ireland. One hundred and fifty delegates fought over eighty seats. After a scuffle in the main conference center, the Kindred and Nelson campaigns nominated each of their candidates.

The district is strongly Democratic, with a Cook Partisan Voting Index (CPVI) of D+30 — by far the most Democratic district in the state. The 5th is also the most Democratic district in the Upper Midwest. The Minnesota Democratic–Farmer–Labor Party (DFL) has held the seat without interruption since 1963, and the Republicans have not tallied more than 40 percent of the vote in almost half a century.

The district is represented by Ilhan Omar, who is the first Somali–American to serve in the U.S. House of Representatives, and the first woman of color to represent Minnesota in that chamber. Omar, also an American Muslim, succeeded Keith Ellison, the first American Muslim to serve in Congress, after he was elected Minnesota Attorney General.

List of members representing the district

Recent elections

2002

2004

2006

Congressman Martin Sabo, DFL, retired after 26 years in the House. Keith Ellison, also a DFLer, replaced him. Although Ellison was endorsed by the DFL convention, four non-endorsed candidates ran strong campaigns against him in the DFL primary: Gail Dorfman, Mike Erlandson, Ember Reichgott Junge, and Jack Nelson Pallmeyer. Ellison won the primary with 41% of the vote. In the general election, he won with 56% of the vote against Jay Pond of the Green Party, Tammy Lee of the Independence Party, and Alan Fine of the Republican Party. Ellison was the first Muslim member of the U.S. Congress.

2008

2010

•

2012

2014

2016

2018

2020

Election results from recent statewide races

See also

Minnesota's congressional districts
List of United States congressional districts

References

05
Anoka County, Minnesota
Hennepin County, Minnesota
Ramsey County, Minnesota